Sachsenring may mean:

 Sachsenring (circuit), a racing circuit in Saxony, Germany
 Sachsenring AG, an East German car company named after the race track, formerly VEB Sachsenring